Andrea Green  (born ) is a British female Paralympic sitting volleyball player. She is part of the Great Britain women's national sitting volleyball team.

She competed at the 2012 Summer Paralympics finishing 7th. 
On club level she played for Loughborough Lions in 2012.

See also
 Great Britain at the 2012 Summer Paralympics

References

1970 births
Living people
Volleyball players at the 2012 Summer Paralympics
Paralympic volleyball players of Great Britain
British women's volleyball players
British sitting volleyball players
Women's sitting volleyball players
Place of birth missing (living people)
21st-century British women